Catadoides is a genus of moths in the family Erebidae. The genus was erected by George Thomas Bethune-Baker in 1908.

Species
Catadoides fijiensis Robinson, 1975 Fiji
Catadoides longipalpis (Swinhoe, 1903) Peninsular Malaysia, Borneo, Java
Catadoides punctata Bethune-Baker, 1908 New Guinea, Seram
Catadoides russula Holloway, 2008 Borneo
Catadoides vunindawa Robinson, 1875 Fiji

References

Hypeninae
Moth genera